The Pro-Am Poker Equalizer is a televised poker tournament in which professional poker players play Texas hold 'em against celebrities which began airing on ESPN in January 2007.  In order to "equalize" the playing field, the celebrities start the tournament with 50% more chips than the professionals.  The Pro-Am Poker Equalizer is commentated by Phil Gordon and Ali Nejad.  The winners of each of the six regular episodes will face off in the final episode for a $500,000 grand prize.

Episodes
Six episodes of the Equalizer have been produced, featuring commentary by Phil Gordon and Ali Nejad, and sideline reporting and interviews by Mieke Buchan. The series features the following celebrities and pros:

Episode 1 (first aired January 7, 2007):

Phil Ivey (episode winner)
John Juanda
Erick Lindgren
Daniel Negreanu
José Canseco
Cheryl Hines

Episode 2:

Johnny Chan
Gus Hansen
Mike Matusow
Shawn Sheikhan
Yancey Arias
Nicholas Gonzalez (episode winner)

Episode 3:

Allen Cunningham (episode winner)
Ted Forrest
Clonie Gowen
David Williams
Penn Jillette
Jennifer Tilly (as a celebrity despite having won a bracelet at the World Series of Poker)

Episode 4:

Chris Ferguson
Jennifer Harman
Phil Laak  (episode winner)
Howard Lederer
Cindy Margolis
Jeremy Sisto

Episode 5:

Andy Bloch  (episode winner)
Gabe Kaplan
Erik Seidel
Gavin Smith
Don Cheadle
Shannon Elizabeth

Episode 6:

David Benyamine
Jamie Gold
Jeff Madsen
Huck Seed (episode winner)
Jason Alexander
Shana Hiatt

Championship:

Huck Seed
Andy Bloch (champion - $500,000)
Phil Laak (runner up - $150,000)
Allen Cunningham
Nicholas Gonzalez
Phil Ivey

References

External links
 

Full Tilt Poker
2007 American television series debuts
2010s American television series
American non-fiction television series
Television shows about poker
Poker in North America
ESPN original programming